Dominion Hills Historic District is a national historic district located at Arlington County, Virginia. It contains 446 contributing buildings in a residential neighborhood in western Arlington. It was platted in 1942 and developed between 1945 and 1948.  It was designed to attract working and middle-income residents and is composed exclusively of two-story Colonial Revival style dwellings.

It was listed on the National Register of Historic Places in 2012.

Notable residents
Warren Beatty and Shirley MacLaine, both who both would grow up to become acclaimed actors,  lived with their family at 930 North Liberty Street in the 1950s.

References

External links
Dominion Hills Civic Association

Houses on the National Register of Historic Places in Virginia
Colonial Revival architecture in Virginia
Historic districts on the National Register of Historic Places in Virginia
Houses in Arlington County, Virginia
National Register of Historic Places in Arlington County, Virginia